Linwood Peak is an isolated peak on Hershey Ridge, standing  west of Mount Ronne in the Ford Ranges of Marie Byrd Land, Antarctica. It was discovered and mapped by the United States Antarctic Service (1939–41), and was named by the Advisory Committee on Antarctic Names for Linwood T. Miller, a sailmaker with the Byrd Antarctic Expedition (1933–35).

References

Mountains of Marie Byrd Land